"Clouds" is a song by American singer-songwriter Zach Sobiech. It was his debut and only single released as a solo artist, released digitally on December 14, 2012, and later included on his debut EP, Fix Me Up (released under his band name, A Firm Handshake).

Proceeds from the sale of "Clouds" go to the Zach Sobiech Osteosarcoma Fund, which is a branch of the Children's Cancer Research Fund.

In the United States, "Clouds" sold 25,000 units before Sobiech's passing, and an additional 30,000 units on his death date. In total, he had sold 156,000 copies of "Clouds" upon his Hot 100 entry, and has since accumulated 20 million views on YouTube. The single charted in the US, the UK, Canada, France and Belgium.

Background
At age 14, Sobiech was diagnosed with osteosarcoma, a bone cancer that mostly affects children. In May 2012, Sobiech's doctors informed him that he had up to a year to live. Sobiech recorded the song "Clouds" about his battle with cancer.

Release and promotion
Sobiech released it as a YouTube video in December 2012. It went viral, surpassing 3 million views at the time of his death in May 2013. Views had reached 11.8 million by end of November 2013.

Around 30 stars had begun releasing tribute versions of the song. One version was released on SoulPancake, featuring Bryan Cranston, Rainn Wilson, Ashley Tisdale, Colbie Caillat, Anna Faris, Chris Pratt, Jason Mraz, Sara Bareilles, Jenna Fischer, Rachel Bilson, Sarah Silverman, Jason Derulo, Kina Grannis, Paul McDonald, and Phillip Phillips among other celebrities and Sobiech's family and friends lip-synching to "Clouds". This video of artists was assembled by Rainn Wilson, and directed by Justin Baldoni who had also directed a short documentary about Sobiech, titled My Last Days. At the end of the video, Jason Mraz is shown saying, "Thank you Zach. You've written a great song, dude. It's a real pleasure to sing it, and sing it with you. Thank you."

Legacy

Clouds 
On October 16, 2020, Disney+ released the movie Clouds, a musical drama film based upon the memoir Fly a Little Higher: How God Answered a Mom's Small Prayer in a Big Way by Laura Sobiech. The film stars Fin Argus, Sabrina Carpenter, Madison Iseman, Neve Campbell, Tom Everett Scott and Lil Rel Howery. 

After the release of the film, the song "Clouds" topped the iTunes song chart at the No. 1 spot a second time, seven years after Zach Sobiech's death. Clouds: A Musical Celebration, a virtual concert was held as a musical tribute on October 24, 2020, with OneRepublic, Fin Argus, Sabrina Carpenter and various members of the Clouds cast participating.

Credits and personnel
Single
Zach Sobiech: guitar and lead vocals
Karl Demer: producer/mix engineer – Atomic K Records & Productions
Merritt Benton: tracking engineer
John Lynn: piano
Zach Miller: drums
Sean O'Hea: bass
Matt Vannelli: guitar

Music video
Video and editing: Mike Rominski – Wooly Rhino Productions
References:

Charts

Weekly charts

Year-end charts

Awards and nominations
Upper Midwest Emmy Nomination for Best Music Composition/Arrangement

References

2012 debut singles
Viral videos
2012 songs
2012 YouTube videos
2010s ballads